Szczepankowo  is a village in the administrative district of Gmina Śniadowo, within Łomża County, Podlaskie Voivodeship, in north-eastern Poland.

The village has a population of 460.

Graveyard 

In parish cemetery is located Russian soldiers' grave fallen in battle against Germans of Szczepankowo in 1944.

References

Szczepankowo
Łomża Governorate
Białystok Voivodeship (1919–1939)
Warsaw Voivodeship (1919–1939)
Belastok Region

World War II cemeteries in Poland
Soviet military memorials and cemeteries in Poland